Twardowski (feminine: Twardowska, plural: Twardowscy) is a Polish surname. Tvardovsky, feminine: Tvardovskaya, are  English transliterations from Russian. Notable people with the surname include:

 Jan Twardowski (1915–2006), Polish priest and poet
 Julia Twardowska (born 1995),  Polish female volleyball player
 Kasper Twardowski, (1592-ca. 1641), Polish poet
 Kazimierz Twardowski (1866–1938), Polish philosopher and logician
 Romuald Twardowski (b. 1930), Polish composer
 Aleksandr Tvardovsky (1910–1971), Russian poet

Fictional characters
Pan Twardowski, a fictional character  from Polish folklore and literature, who sold his soul in exchange for special powers 
Pani Twardowska from the humorous ballad by Adam Mickiewicz

See also

Polish-language surnames